KCA University (KCAU) is a private, non-profit institution, founded in July 1989 as Kenya College of Accountancy (KCA) by the Institute of Certified Public Accountants of Kenya (ICPAK) to improve the quality of accountancy and financial management training in the country.  KCAU is located on Thika Road in Ruaraka, Nairobi, Kenya.  The institution also maintains satellite colleges under the School of Professional Programmes in Nairobi CBD Githunguri, Kericho, Eldoret, Kisumu, Amagoro, and Kitengela.

History

Following a study by Chart Foulks Lynch CIPFA in the UK, Kenya College of Accountancy was founded in 1987-88.  The study concluded that the Kenyan economy required an additional four hundred qualified accountants yearly.  From an initial enrollment of 170 students in 1989, the student population has increased tremendously over the years and now stands at over 15,000 enrolled annually.

KCA applied to the Commission for Higher Education (CHE) for university status in the year 2000 and on July 26, 2007, CHE awarded KCA a Letter of Interim Authority (LIA). Operations then began at KCA University.

Faculties and programs

Schools

 Commerce and Distance Learning                                                                                                                                                  
 School of Technology
 School of Professional Programs (SPP)
 School of Education
 Institute for Capacity Development (ICAD)

Degree programs

 MBA Corporate Management

 Bachelor of Science (Information Security and Forensics)

 Post Graduate Diploma (Corporate Governance)
 Bachelor of Science (Commerce)
Bachelor of Science (Business Management and Procurement)
 Bachelor of Science (Information Technology)
 Bachelor of Education
 Bachelor of Science (Business Information Technology)
 Bachelor of arts ( Criminology)
 Bachelor of Science (Software Development)
Bachelor of Science (Applied Computing)
 Bachelor of Science (Gaming and Information Technology)
 Bachelor of Science (Actuarial Science)

Diploma programs

 Diploma in Information Technology
 Diploma in Business Information Technology
 Diploma in accounting and finance
 Diploma in Business  Management
Diploma in procurement and logistics

Certificate programs

 Certificate in County Governance
 Certificate in Information Technology
 Certificate in Business Information Technology
 Certificate in Bridging Mathematics
 Certificate in Research Methodology

References

External links
 
 Commission for Higher Education, http://www.che.or.ke
 United Nations Global Compact, http://www.unglobalcompact.org/participant/11852-KCA-University
 Ministry of Higher Education, Science and Technology, https://web.archive.org/web/20110722131940/http://www.scienceandtechnology.go.ke/index.php?option=com_content&task=view&id=60&Itemid=61

Education in Nairobi
Universities and colleges in Kenya
Business schools in Africa
Educational institutions established in 1989
1989 establishments in Kenya
1980s in Nairobi